Chinglensana Singh Kangujam (born 2 December 1991) is an Indian field hockey player who plays as a halfback. He made his debut in the Indian team in 2012, and plays for Dabang Mumbai in the Hockey India League.

Career

International career
Singh was named as a stand-by player for the 2011 Champions Trophy in Ordos City, China, and was selected in the main squad following the dropping out of two players. However, he missed out as his passport was not ready at the time. Eventually, he made his debut in 2011, at the Champions Challenge I in South Africa. He was a part of the team that competed at the 2014 Commonwealth Games in Glasgow, finishing second, and a ninth-place finish at the 2014 World Cup. In the same year, he won the gold medal with the team at the Asian Games in Incheon.

Club career
At the auction of the inaugural season of Hockey India League, Singh was bought by the Mumbai franchise for  22,000. The team named Mumbai Magicians finished fifth in both the first and the second seasons before announcing their withdrawal from the league in September 2014. Singh finished with one goal in the two seasons. Following the Magicians' withdrawal, Singh was signed by the then new team Dabang Mumbai, for the 2015 season.

References

External links
Chinglensana Kangujam profile at Hockey India

1991 births
Living people
Field hockey players from Manipur
Indian male field hockey players
Male field hockey midfielders
Field hockey players at the 2016 Summer Olympics
Olympic field hockey players of India
Field hockey players at the 2014 Asian Games
Field hockey players at the 2018 Asian Games
2014 Men's Hockey World Cup players
2018 Men's Hockey World Cup players
Asian Games gold medalists for India
Asian Games bronze medalists for India
Asian Games medalists in field hockey
Medalists at the 2014 Asian Games
Medalists at the 2018 Asian Games
Field hockey players at the 2014 Commonwealth Games
Field hockey players at the 2018 Commonwealth Games
Commonwealth Games silver medallists for India
Commonwealth Games medallists in field hockey
Hockey India League players
Recipients of the Arjuna Award
Medallists at the 2014 Commonwealth Games